"Boom! It Was Over" is a song co-written and recorded by American country music artist Robert Ellis Orrall.  It was released in October 1992 as the first single from the album Flying Colors.  The song reached number 19 on the Billboard Hot Country Singles & Tracks chart.  The song was written by Orrall and Bill Lloyd.

Chart performance

References 

1992 songs
1992 singles
Robert Ellis Orrall songs
Songs written by Bill Lloyd (country musician)
Songs written by Robert Ellis Orrall
Song recordings produced by Josh Leo
RCA Records singles